Robert Griffith (1501/1502 – 1568) was an English politician.

Griffith was mayor of Salisbury in 1545. He was a Member (MP) of the Parliament of England for Salisbury in April 1554 and November 1554.

References

1502 births
1568 deaths
English MPs 1554
English MPs 1554–1555
Mayors of Salisbury